Iman Dozy (10 May 1887– 18 July 1957) was a Dutch football player.

Club career
In 1901, Dozy made his debut at Ajax Leiden, the club for which he would go on to play 175 matches.

International career
He made his debut for the Netherlands national football team in an April 1907 friendly match against England and earned a total of 4 caps, all in 1907.

Administration
In 1927, he became chairman of Ajax Sportsman Combinatie, the club formed by the merger of Ajax Leiden en De Sportman. He was named honorary chairman of the club in 1952.

References

External links
 

1887 births
1957 deaths
Association football midfielders
Dutch football chairmen and investors
Dutch footballers
Netherlands international footballers
People from Semarang Regency
Footballers from Leiden